Radikal was a Turkish newspaper.

Radikal may also refer to:
 Radikall (German magazine), a German anarchist magazine; see XS4ALL
 Radikal Records, an American record label
 Radikal Ungdom, a Danish political youth organization
 Radikall, a 2017 album by Iranian-born musician Shahin Najafi

See also
 Radical (disambiguation)